Tenerife Airport may refer to several airports on the Spanish island of Tenerife, in the Canary Islands:

 Tenerife North Airport (1978–present), formerly known as Los Rodeos Airport
 Tenerife South Airport (1978–present), also known as Reina Sofia Airport
 Tenerife International Airport (1964–1978), renamed Tenerife North Airport in 1978